Michael Wagner (born 18 December 1975) is an Austrian former professional footballer who played as a midfielder. He made ten appearances for the Austria national team.

Career statistics

References

Living people
1975 births
Austrian footballers
Association football midfielders
Austria international footballers
FK Austria Wien players
SC Freiburg players
SK Rapid Wien players
FC Admira Wacker Mödling players
Austrian Football Bundesliga players
Bundesliga players
Austrian expatriate footballers
Expatriate footballers in Germany